Ihor Dedyshyn (born 9 March 1977) is a Ukrainian football manager, media manager, and journalist. Dedyshyn was born in Krupsko village, Lviv, Ukraine, and continues to reside in Lviv.

Biography
Education
1994-1999 — studied at Lviv National University named after Ivan Franko on Journalism Program. Graduated with Diploma of specialist in Journalism.

Career 
 1999-2001 — Sport journalist, editor of sport department in newspaper “Express”. (Lviv)
 2001-2002 — Director and editor-in-chief of the national newspaper “Sportpanorama”.
 2002-2004 — Head of media advertising and publishing department of FC “Karpaty”
 2004-2006 — Chief of “Karpaty Sport Marketing”.
 2006-2007 — Commercial director of FC “Karpaty” (Ukraine, Lviv).
 2007-2009 — Deputy general manager of FC “Karpaty” (Ukraine, Lviv).
 2009-2015 — General manager of FC “Karpaty”. (Ukraine, Lviv)

Positions
 Member of professional football committee FFU,
 General manager of FC “Karpaty”,
 General manager of media-holding “ZIK”,
 Editor-in-chief of the newspaper “Sportpanorama”.
 Editor of sport department in newspaper “Express” (Lviv).

References

Ukrainian sports journalists
1977 births
Living people
People from Lviv Oblast
FC Karpaty Lviv